Two ships of the British Royal Navy have been named HMS Poppy after the flower.

  was an  sloop launched in 1915 and sold in 1923. 
  was a  launched in 1941 and sold in 1946  for mercantile service as Rami.

References

Royal Navy ship names